The  or KELC is a Lutheran church in Japan. It currently has approximately 2,600 baptized members in 29 congregations nationwide.

The current president is the Rev Shigeo Sueoka.

History
The KELC traces its history to the eviction of foreign Christian missionaries from mainland China in the 1950s after the establishment of the People's Republic of China. In 1951, missionaries from the Norwegian Missionary Society (NMS) and the Evangelical Lutheran Free Church of Norway (LFCN) established a mission in Japan, primarily in the Kinki region.

On November 3, 1961, 14 congregations planted by the NMS and LFCN organised themselves as the KELC. In 1976, the KELC was accepted as a full member of the Lutheran World Federation. The KELC was officially recognized as a religious body in 1980.

Structure and organization

Congregations by prefectures
Hyōgo Prefecture
Congregations in the cities of Amagasaki, Kawanishi, Kobe, Sanda and Takarazuka

Osaka Prefecture
Congregations in the cities of Hannan, Izumisano, Osaka, Sakai, and Yao

Wakayama Prefecture
Congregations in the cities of Kainan, and Wakayama as well as the town of Misato

Nara Prefecture
Congregations in the cities of Nara, Sakurai and Kashihara

Mie Prefecture
Congregations in the cities of Shima, and Tsu

Ministries
Some KELC local congregations operate kindergartens and nursery schools. The KELC also sponsors the Kobe Lutheran Theological Seminary together with the West Japan Evangelical Lutheran Church.

Affiliations & cooperation
The work of Lutheran missionaries resulted in the establishment of five major Lutheran church bodies and a number of smaller ones, with a total membership of approximately 30,000. The largest of these, with about 20,000 members, is the Japan Evangelical Lutheran Church. Other Lutheran churches include the Japan Lutheran Church, the West Japan Evangelical Lutheran Church, the Japan Lutheran Brethren Church, the Lutheran Evangelical Christian Church and the Fellowship Deaconry Evangelical Church (Marburger Mission).

Cooperation among the various Lutheran churches in Japan is common, particularly with respect to outreach ministries. Church planting plans are mutually shared in order to avoid duplications.

The KELC is also a full member of the Lutheran World Federation and is cooperates with the Norwegian Missionary Society and the Evangelical Lutheran Free Church of Norway Japan Mission.

See also
Christianity in Japan
Protestantism in Japan

References

External links

Lutheranism in Japan
Japan
Christian organizations established in 1951
Lutheran denominations established in the 20th century
1951 establishments in Japan